Ford GT is a mid-engine two-seater sports car produced for the 2005 to 2006 model years, and the 2016 to 2020 model years.

It may also refer to:
 Ford GT40, a 1960s racing car
 Ford GT70, a limited production rally sports car made by Ford of Britain in 1970 and a 1971 concept car by Ghia
 Ford GT90, a 1995 concept car
 Galpin GTR1, a 2013 limited production sports car
 Ford GTX1, a roadster model of the Ford GT

Unrelated to the cars above:
Ford GTB, a tactical truck
Ford GT75, a diesel lawn tractor
Ford Mustang GT, a V8-powered muscle car
 Ford Falcon GT, iconic Australian muscle car

See also 
 Super GT, a grand touring car race series in Japan